The 27th Massachusetts General Court, consisting of the Massachusetts Senate and the Massachusetts House of Representatives, met in 1806 and 1807 during the governorship of Caleb Strong. John Bacon served as president of the Senate and Perez Morton served as speaker of the House.

Senators

Representatives

See also
 9th United States Congress
 10th United States Congress
 List of Massachusetts General Courts

References

External links
 . (Includes data for state senate and house elections in 1806)
 
 
 
 
 

Political history of Massachusetts
Massachusetts legislative sessions
massachusetts
1806 in Massachusetts
massachusetts
1807 in Massachusetts